The 1998 Arab Futsal Championship took place in Cairo, Egypt from 6 December to 12 December 1998.
Mauritania were originally invited, but declined and were replaced by Palestine.

Egypt defeated Morocco in the final, 8-4.

Group stage

Group 1

Matches

Group 2

Matches

Semifinals

3rd Place

Final

Honors

Sources
Futsal Planet
RSSSF
Scores

1998
1998
Arab Futsal Championship, 1998
1998 in Asian football
1998 in African football